This article contains a list of named passenger trains in the United States, with names beginning S through Z.

S

T

U, V

W

X, Y, & Z

Notes

References

North America (S-Z)
 S-Z
Named passenger trains